The Paleface is a 1922 American silent comedy Western two-reeler film starring Buster Keaton.

Plot
Crooked "oil sharks" led by a man named Hunt have stolen an Indian tribe's lease to their land and given them 24 hours to vacate. Furious, the Indian chief orders that the first white man who enters their encampment be killed. A butterfly collector (Keaton) unwittingly wanders in while chasing a butterfly. They tie him to a stake and collect wood. When he frees himself, the Indian warriors give chase. During the pursuit, he finds some asbestos and fashions himself some fireproof underwear. As a result, when they catch him and try to burn him at the stake, he remains unharmed. Awed by this, the Indians adopt him and give him the title "Little Chief Paleface".

He subsequently leads the tribe in a confrontation with the crooks. When a brawl breaks out, the crooks' leader Hunt flees. The Indians give chase, with Little Chief Paleface bringing up the rear. Hunt captures the hero, forces him to switch clothes and gets away in disguise. After being nearly skewered by arrows from his own tribe, Little Chief Paleface finds the deed to the land in a pocket. As his reward, he chooses a pretty Indian maiden.

Cast
 Buster Keaton asLittle Chief Paleface
 Virginia Fox as Indian Maiden (uncredited)
 Joe Roberts as The Indian Chief (uncredited)

See also
 List of American films of 1922
 Buster Keaton filmography

External links

 
 
 
 The Paleface at the International Buster Keaton Society

1922 films
Films directed by Buster Keaton
American black-and-white films
1920s Western (genre) comedy films
American silent short films
Films produced by Joseph M. Schenck
Films with screenplays by Buster Keaton
1922 short films
American comedy short films
1922 comedy films
Silent American Western (genre) comedy films
Films about Native Americans
1920s American films
1920s English-language films